Kings Park is a suburb of Sydney, in the state of New South Wales, Australia. Kings Park is located 40 km west of the Sydney central business district, in the local government area of the City of Blacktown and part of the Greater Western Sydney region.

Description
Kings Park is bounded by the Richmond railway line to the west, the Westlink M7 to the north, Sunnyholt Road to the east and Breakfast Creek to the south. The southern half of the suburb is industrial while the northern half is newer residential homes. There are no schools or shopping centres within Kings Park with these facilities found in the neighbouring suburbs of Marayong, Blacktown and Kings Langley. The major landmarks are St Andrews church, and Blacktown Indoor Sports centre near Marayong railway station and Faulkland Crescent Reserve in the northern part of the suburb. 

The suburb has three Christian church denominations represented, Catholic, Brethren and Pentecostal. A Hindu Temple is also in the suburb, while a Sikh temple is located nearby.

History
Kings Park was originally part of Marayong, but with increased residential development, residents wanted a separate identity, and the developer's estate name was adopted in 1987.

Population
In the 2016 Census, there were 3,453 people in Kings Park. 69.9% of people were born in Australia. The next most common countries of birth were Philippines 3.0%, India 3.0% and England 2.9%. 75.3% of people spoke only English at home. The most common responses for religion were Catholic 32.4%, No Religion 21.3% and Anglican 15.2%.

Transport
The suburb is served by Marayong railway station on the Richmond railway line and the Blacktown-Parklea branch of the North-West T-way.

References 

Suburbs of Sydney
City of Blacktown
Populated places established in 1987
1987 establishments in Australia